Baraladei Daniel Igali (born February 3, 1974 in Eniwari, Bayelsa State, Nigeria) is a Canadian freestyle wrestler who is an Olympic gold medallist. He lives in Surrey, British Columbia.

Wrestling career
As captain of the Nigerian wrestling team he came to Canada to compete in the 1994 Commonwealth Games. He remained in the country while seeking refugee status due to political unrest in Nigeria. He acquired citizenship in 1998.

In Canada, Igali won 116 consecutive matches wrestling at Simon Fraser University from 1997 to 1999. He placed fourth at the 1998 world championships. He finished second at the 1998 World Cup and won a bronze medal at the 1999 Pan American Games. He was coached by Nasir Lal, two-time Canadian olympian from Afghanistan.

At the 2000 Summer Olympic Games in Sydney, Australia, Igali won a gold medal in the Men's 69 kg freestyle wrestling. He represented Canada at the world stage. At the 2002 Commonwealth Games in Manchester, Igali won a gold medal in the Men's 74 kg freestyle wrestling. In 2007, Igali was inducted into the Canada's Sports Hall of Fame. He was later inducted into the Canadian Olympic Hall of Fame in 2012.

His wrestling career is highlighted in a television documentary directed by Joel Gordon called, "Wrestling with Destiny: The Life and Times of Daniel Igali". The biographical documentary film was broadcast by CBC Television in 2004 as an episode of the Life and Times TV series.

Igali became president of the Nigeria Wrestling Federation, creating the highest morale athletes for the 2018 Commonwealth Games, and highest medal hopefuls for Nigeria at the Games. The Nigerian team has otherwise lacklustre morale outside of wrestling. In September 2022, Igali was elected as a board member of UWW (United World Wrestling) for a five year term.

Politics
On February 10, 2005, Igali announced that he would seek nomination as a candidate in Surrey-Newton for the British Columbia Liberal Party in the 2005 provincial election in British Columbia. He won the nomination, but was defeated by New Democrat opponent Harry Bains in the election.

Personal
He completed a Master of Arts degree in criminology at Simon Fraser University, having previously attended Douglas College. While working on his master's degree, he trained at SFU and liked to help coach. Igali is currently the coach of the Nigerian National Wrestling Team.

In November 2006 Igali was injured during a violent robbery while in Nigeria. In 2020, he was the president of the Nigeria Wrestling Federation. He is a two-term member of the Bayelsa State assembly and also its sports commissioner.

In 2012, Igali was one of the recipients of the Top 25 Canadian Immigrant Awards presented by Canadian Immigrant Magazine.

References

1974 births
Living people
Black Canadian sportspeople
British Columbia Liberal Party politicians
Canadian sportsperson-politicians
British Columbia Liberal Party candidates in British Columbia provincial elections
Commonwealth Games competitors for Nigeria
Commonwealth Games gold medallists for Canada
Lou Marsh Trophy winners
Medalists at the 2000 Summer Olympics
Naturalized citizens of Canada
Nigerian emigrants to Canada
Nigerian male sport wrestlers
Olympic gold medalists for Canada
Olympic medalists in wrestling
Olympic wrestlers of Canada
Pan American Games bronze medalists for Canada
Sportspeople from Surrey, British Columbia
Simon Fraser University alumni
Wrestlers at the 1999 Pan American Games
Wrestlers at the 1994 Commonwealth Games
Wrestlers at the 2002 Commonwealth Games
Wrestlers at the 2000 Summer Olympics
Canadian male sport wrestlers
Wrestlers at the 2004 Summer Olympics
Commonwealth Games medallists in wrestling
Pan American Games medalists in wrestling
Black Canadian politicians
World Wrestling Championships medalists
Medalists at the 1999 Pan American Games
Medallists at the 2002 Commonwealth Games